Innauer is a surname. Notable people with the surname include:
 
Mario Innauer (born 1990), Austrian ski jumper
Toni Innauer (born 1958), Austrian ski jumper